The Nancy Ward Tomb is the tomb of Nancy Ward, her brother and her son in Benton, Tennessee, U.S. In 1923, a plaque reading "Princess and Prophetess of the Cherokee Nation, the Pocahontas of Tennessee, and a constant friend of the American Pioneer" was installed by the Nancy Ward Chapter of the Daughters of the American Revolution. It has been listed on the National Register of Historic Places since April 11, 1973.

References

National Register of Historic Places in Polk County, Tennessee
Tombs in the United States
Cherokee Nation (1794–1907)